Aniko may refer to:
Anikó, female given name
Aniko or Araniko (1245–1306), a key figure in the arts of Nepal, Tibet, and Yuan China
Aniko, stage name for Canadian singer Mary Lou Farrell (1942–2011)